The Garden Island is a daily newspaper based in Lihue, Hawaii, covering the islands of Kauai and Niihau. The Garden Island began publication in 1902. It was formerly owned by Scripps League Newspapers, which was acquired by Pulitzer in 1996; Lee Enterprises acquired Pulitzer in 2005.  Oahu Publications Inc., publisher of the Honolulu Star-Advertiser, acquired The Garden Island newspaper from Lee Enterprises in January 2013.

References

External links
 
 
 The Garden Island issues from May 2, 1911 to December 26, 1922 on Chronicling America

Newspapers published in Hawaii
Publications established in 1902
Kauai
1902 establishments in Hawaii
Black Press newspapers